Russian lace is a bobbin tape lace. The tape is made with bobbins at the same time as the rest of the lace, curving back on itself, and joined using a crochet hook. It was made in Russia, but similar laces made elsewhere are also called Russian lace.
 
The designs of Russian lace are of abstract form. The narrow tapes or trails follow a maze-like path through deep scallops to merge again and wander into the next.

Types of Russian Lace:

Vologda lace

Yelets lace

Mtsensk lace

Kalyazin lace

Torzhok lace

Ryazan Lace

Skopin Lace 

Mikhailov Lace

Yaroslavl lace

Kostroma lace

Vyatka lace

Kukarskoe lace

Belevsky Lace

Odoevsky Lace

Nizhny Novgorod lace

Gallery

References

External links

 Vologda lace - a type of Russian lace
Soviet Life

Bobbin lace